Luke Lowe (1889–?) was an English professional footballer who played as an outside forward. He played for Eccles Borough before moving to Football League Second Division side Burnley in December 1911. He played his only senior match for Burnley on 16 December 1911 in the 1–1 draw away at Huddersfield Town. Lowe left Burnley in February 1912 and subsequently signed for Lancashire Combination outfit Accrington Stanley.

References

1889 births
Year of death missing
English footballers
Association football forwards
Burnley F.C. players
Accrington Stanley F.C. (1891) players
English Football League players
Eccles United F.C. players